A petard was a medieval small bomb used to blow up gates and walls when breaching fortifications.

Petard may also refer to:
 HMS Petard, the name of two ships of the Royal Navy
 A firecracker

People with the surname
 Paul Petard (1912-1980), French botanist

See also
 "Petarded", an episode of Family Guy
 "Hoist with his own petard", a phrase from the Shakespeare play Hamlet
 H. Pétard, a pseudonym used by Ralph P. Boas Jr., based on the iconic phrase